Patrick Daniel Sabatini (born November 9, 1990) is an American mixed martial artist who competes in the Featherweight division of the Ultimate Fighting Championship.

Background
Born and raised in Bristol, Pennsylvania, Sabatini initially played ice hockey at his father's behest. After a school bully stuck Pat’s head in a urinal, he started training karate which led to Brazilian jiu-jitsu a couple of years later. Afterwards he picked up wrestling, mixed martial arts and combat sambo. He has a younger sister. He has a Bachelor of Arts degree from Rider University.

Mixed martial arts career

Early career
In his MMA debut for Cage Fury Fighting Championships at CFFC 35, he submitted Jacob Bohn via rear naked choke in the first round, before beating his next opponent Shelby Graham in the same manner. After suffering his first loss via unanimous decision to Robert Watley at CFFC 45, he rebounded at CFFC 52, where he submitted Tony Gravely in the first round via rear naked choke. Sabatini would go on to win his next three bouts outside if CFFC, before he returned to appear in the main event of CFFC 67, where he tapped out John de Jesus in the first round via heel hook, winning the CFFC Featherweight Championship. Sabatini defended the title submitting Fransisco Isata via rear naked choke in round two at CFFC 69. Sabatini faced Jose Mariscal at Victory FC 60, losing the bout via split decision. Rebounding at CES MMA 52, he defeating Borah Karmo via first round rear-naked choke.

At CFFC 71, Sabatini faced Da’Mon Blackshear and defeated him via unanimous decision, winning back the CFFC Featherweight Championship. Defending his title at CFFC 74, he faced Fabricio Oliveira and tapped him out via rear naked choke in round two.

Sabatini would lose the CFFC Featherweight Championship to James Gonzalez at CFFC 81 after he broke his arm in a gruesome manner after refusing to tap. Returned at CFFC 84 against Jordan Titoni, winning the bout after knocking out Titoni in the first round. He would then win back the Featherweight title, submitting Jesse Stirn via armbar in the second round at CFFC 91.

Ultimate Fighting Championship
Sabatini was signed to replace Mike Trizano on short notice against Rafael Alves at UFC Fight Night: Blaydes vs. Lewis on February 20, 2021. However, Alves missed weight by 11.5lbs – a UFC record to date – and the bout was cancelled.

He ultimately made his UFC debut against Tristan Connelly at UFC 261 on April 24, 2021. He won the fight via unanimous decision after knocking Connelly down early in the first round.

Sabatini then made his sophomore appearance in the organization against Jamall Emmers at UFC on ESPN: Barboza vs. Chikadze on August 28, 2021. He won the fight via first-round submission, gaining his first Performance of the Night bonus.

He was then initially scheduled to face Gavin Tucker at UFC Fight Night: Vieira vs. Tate on November 20, 2021. However, Tucker withdrew from the bout due to an unknown reason and was replaced by Tucker Lutz. Sabatini won the bout via unanimous decision.

The match between Gavin Tucker and Sabatini was rescheduled for UFC 273 on April 9, 2022. However, Tucker pulled out due to unknown reasons and Sabatini was rebooked against T.J. Laramie on April 16, 2022 at UFC on ESPN: Luque vs. Muhammad 2. Sabatini won the fight via unanimous decision.

Sabatini faced Damon Jackson on September 17, 2022 at UFC Fight Night 210. He lost the fight via technical knockout in round one.

Championships and accomplishments
Ultimate Fighting Championship
Performance of the Night (One time) 
Cage Fury Fighting Championships
CFFC Featherweight Championship (two times; former)
Three successful title defenses (first reign)

Mixed martial arts record

|-
|Loss
|align=center|17–4
|Damon Jackson
|TKO (punches)
|UFC Fight Night: Sandhagen vs. Song 
|
|align=center|1
|align=center|1:09
|Las Vegas, Nevada, United States
|
|-
|Win
|align=center|17–3
|T.J. Laramie
|Decision (unanimous)
|UFC on ESPN: Luque vs. Muhammad 2 
|
|align=center|3
|align=center|5:00
|Las Vegas, Nevada, United States
|
|-
| Win
| align=center|16–3
| Tucker Lutz
| Decision (unanimous)
|UFC Fight Night: Vieira vs. Tate
|
| align=center|3
| align=center|5:00
|Las Vegas, Nevada, United States
|
|-
| Win
| align=center|15–3
| Jamall Emmers
|Submission (heel hook)
|UFC on ESPN: Barboza vs. Chikadze 
|
|align=center|1
|align=center|1:53
|Las Vegas, Nevada, United States
|
|-
| Win
| align=center|14–3
| Tristan Connelly
|Decision (unanimous)
|UFC 261 
|
|align=center|3
|align=center|5:00
|Jacksonville, Florida, United States
|
|-
| Win
| align=center| 13–3
|Jesse Stirn
|Submission (armbar)
|CFFC 91
|
|align=center|2
|align=center|2:23
|Lancaster, Pennsylvania, United States
|
|-
| Win
| align=center| 12–3
|Jordan Titoni
|KO (punches)
|CFFC 84
|
|align=center|1
|align=center|2:26
|Tunica, Mississippi, United States
|
|-
| Loss
| align=center| 11–3
|James Gonzalez
|TKO (arm injury)
|CFFC 81
|
|align=center|1
|align=center|0:46
|Bensalem, Pennsylvania, United States
|
|-
| Win
| align=center| 11–2
| Fabricio Oliveira
| Submission (rear-naked choke)
| CFFC 74
| 
| align=center|2
| align=center|1:45
| Atlantic City, New Jersey, United States
|
|-
| Win
| align=center| 10–2
| Da'Mon Blackshear
| Decision (unanimous)
| CFFC 71
| 
| align=center| 4
| align=center| 5:00
| Atlantic City, New Jersey, United States
|
|-
| Win
| align=center|9–2
| Boimah Karmo
|TKO (punches)
|CES 52: Norwood vs. Wells
|
|align=center|2
|align=center|2:16
|Philadelphia, Pennsylvania, United States
|  
|-
| Loss
| align=center|8–2
| Jose Mariscal
| Decision (split)
|Victory FC 60
|
| align=center|3
| align=center|5:00
|Hammond, Indiana, United States
|
|-
| Win
| align=center| 8–1
| Francisco Isata
| Submission (rear-naked choke)
| CFFC 69
| 
| align=center| 2
| align=center| 2:47
| Atlantic City, New Jersey, United States
| 
|-
| Win
| align=center| 7–1
| John De Jesus
| Submission (heel hook)
| CFFC 67
| 
| align=center| 1
| align=center| 0:50
| Philadelphia, Pennsylvania, United States
| 
|-
| Win
| align=center| 6–1
| Michael Lawrence
|Submission (rear-naked choke)
|Ring of Combat 58
|
|align=center| 2
|align=center| 2:49
|Atlantic City, New Jersey, United States
|
|-
| Win
| align=center| 5–1
|Renaldo Weekley
|Submission (heel hook)
| Dead Serious 22
| 
| align=center| 1
| align=center| 1:17
| Philadelphia, Pennsylvania, United States
|
|-
| Win
| align=center| 4–1
| William Calhoun III
| Decision (unanimous)
| Dead Serious 18
| 
| align=center|3
| align=center|5:00
| Philadelphia, Pennsylvania, United States
| 
|-
| Win
| align=center| 3–1
| Tony Gravely
| Submission (rear-naked choke)
|CFFC 52
|
| align=center|1
| align=center|2:47
|Atlantic City, New Jersey, United States
|
|-
| Loss
| align=center|2–1
| Robert Watley
|Decision (unanimous)
|CFFC 45
|
| align=center|3
| align=center|5:00
|Bethlehem, Pennsylvania, United States
|
|-
| Win
| align=center| 2–0
| Shelby Graham
| Submission (rear-naked choke)
|CFFC 42
|
| align=center|1
| align=center|1:04
|Chester, Pennsylvania, United States
|
|-
| Win
| align=center|1–0
| Jacob Bohn
| Submission (rear-naked choke)
|CFFC 35
|
|align=center|1
|align=center|2:22
|Atlantic City, New Jersey, United States
|

Submission grappling record
{| class="wikitable sortable" style="font-size:80%; text-align:left;"
|-
| colspan=8 style="text-align:center;" | 1 Match, 1 win 0 Loss
|-
!  Result
!  Rec.
!  Opponent
!  Method
!  text-center|  Event
!  Date
!  Location
|-
|Win|| 1–0 || Alex Caceres|| Submission (Rear Naked Choke)|| Fury Pro Grappling 6|| 30 December 2022||  Philadelphia, Pennsylvania, United States
|-

See also 
 List of current UFC fighters
 List of male mixed martial artists

References

External links 
  
 

1990 births
Living people
American male mixed martial artists
Featherweight mixed martial artists
Mixed martial artists utilizing Tang Soo Do
Mixed martial artists utilizing sambo
Mixed martial artists utilizing wrestling
Mixed martial artists utilizing Brazilian jiu-jitsu
Ultimate Fighting Championship male fighters
American sambo practitioners
American tang soo do practitioners
American practitioners of Brazilian jiu-jitsu
People awarded a black belt in Brazilian jiu-jitsu